Ahmadou Eboa Ngomna (born December 4, 1983) is a professional Cameroonian  footballer currently playing for New Star de Douala.

Career
Ngomna began playing football with Cotonsport Garoua, and made his Elite One debut during a one-year spell at Espérance Guider. He would return to Cotonsport where he played for 8 seasons in Elite One.

Ngomna played recently for Cameroonian side Cotonsport Garoua, Karachi United in Pakistan and Sur Club in Oman.

With Cotonsport, Ngomna captained the club to the 2003 CAF Cup Final and the 2008 CAF Champions League Final. After the club's success in the 2008 CAF Champions League, Ngomna was one of several star players who looked for a transfer to a professional club abroad, but returned to Cotonsport without finalizing a transfer, going on to play in the 2009 CAF Champions League.

Ngomna ultimately secured a move to Omani side Sur Club, where he helped the club win the 2010–11 Oman First Division League championship, scoring as Sur won the final on penalties.

Ngomna played for Al-Kahrabaa FC in the Iraqi Premier League during the 2014–15 season.

Ngomna's older brother, Bouba, is a journalist for a Yaoundé radio station, leading to speculation that Ngomna wasn't selected for the Cameroon national football team due to his brother's criticism of the sports minister.

Notes

1983 births
Living people
Cameroonian footballers
Expatriate footballers in Oman
Coton Sport FC de Garoua players
Expatriate footballers in Pakistan
Cameroonian expatriate footballers
Cameroonian expatriate sportspeople in Oman
Cameroonian expatriate sportspeople in Pakistan
Association football defenders
Expatriate footballers in Iraq
Cameroonian expatriate sportspeople in Iraq
Karachi United players